is a Japanese animator and character designer best known for designing the characters to Hidamari Sketch (2007–2013).

Career
Itou joined Shaft in 1987 as an in-between animator, and by 1989 he was promoted to key animator. In 1995, the studio produced its first original televised work, Juuni Senshi Bakuretsu Eto Ranger, which featured Itou's promotion to animation director. Shaft received numerous outsourcing jobs throughout the 90s of varying genres and styles, some of which had cute characters and comedy-oriented stories, and others which were more serious and had less-than-cute characters. Itou was particularly involved with the mecha series Dual! Itou's first role as a character designer wasn't in-house on a Shaft work, but rather at Group TAC to whom he was lent to. Shaft had developed a relationship with Atsuhiro Iwakami, at the time a producer from SME Visual Works (now called Aniplex) after Shaft was outsourced to for a few episodes of Android Kikaider: The Animation (2001); and Group TAC, needing a character designer for Gakuen Alice (2004), received Itou's help as both character designer and chief animation director due to Iwakami's connection to Shaft.

Three years later, Itou took on the job of character designer for both Hidamari Sketch and a short film adaptation of Kino's Journey, the former of which began a long-running franchise of anime. Although he had worked on Shaft's titles with director Akiyuki Shinbo (who began a long-standing collaboration with the studio in 2004) prior to Hidamari Sketch, the series was Itou's first time directly working with Shinbo; and having seen Shinbo's prior works, such as Le Portrait de Petit Cossette (2004), Itou was initially nervous. Both Shinbo and Ume Aoki, the creator of the Hidamari Sketch manga, thought that he seemed "delicate." Ironically, despite Itou's prior abilities as a mecha animator, he likes cute and warm works, so he felt instantly attracted to Aoki's drawings in the manga. He had trouble with designing and drawing the characters, but was able to succeed with Aoki directly helping with the key elements of her drawings. Aoki stated that she was relieved for the anime seeing that Itou understood the charactersnot just in the style of the drawings themselves, but also in the way that he poses the charactersand said that his drawings were cute. Although Itou also had the role of "chief animation director", he mentioned that he didn't touch the drawings for the second episode of the first season due to the quality of animation director Hideyuki Morioka's drawings. Until 2013, when the anime series ended, Itou continued to design the characters for and act as chief animation director for Hidamari Sketch (and even storyboarded an episode), occasionally helping out as a chief animation director on other series like Natsu no Arashi (2009).

Itou was given the opportunity since he worked a lot with food-related scenes in the anime he worked on, saying that cooking scenes in TV anime ended up getting passed to him in many cases. Since Gourmet Girl Graffiti is mainly focused on cooking, such a role unifying all of the animators' works into a cohesive approach as far as drawings and even color was necessary. Attaining a visual style proved to be somewhat difficult, as Shinbo's only advice when presented with a design was that it "wasn't quite there yet." He worked closely with the color designer, Yasuko Watanabe, and the director of photography, Takayuki Aizu, to achieve what became the result used in the anime itself. Itou himself was in charge of the design and drawings of the foodand he'd also choose which colors to keep and leave out, as well as things like the brightnessand Watanabe would color them per her tastes, and the compositors (Aizu) would then add textures and give more input. Itou ended up focusing on the series' odd episodes and splitting the "meal animation director" role with Hirotoshi Arai, who took on the even episodes. Another aspect of the animation front for the series was using a lot of layers for the food to show depth and, generally, to make it look as good as possible; however, such a method isn't particularly workable under most TV schedules, especially on series where the food isn't a focus, so on a scene Itou was responsible for on March Comes In like a Lion (2016), he made sure that the staff only used two or three layers for the food drawings to reduce the time stress on the production staff's plate.

Works
This is an incomplete list.

Teleivison series
 Highlights character design and chief animation direction roles. Highlights other main animation staff member roles.

OVAs/ONAs

Films

Notes

Works cited

References

External links

Japanese animators
Living people
1967 births